The following is the list of episodes for Geo television drama serial Bashar Momin. The drama serial formally began 14 March 2014. Serial Individual episodes are numbered as follow.

Drama Overview

Episode list
Following is the listing of episodes with short summaries.

Synopsis

Set in 2014, the engagement ceremony of Rudaba (Ushna Shah) is held with none other than Buland Bakhtiar (Sami Khan), who lives in America and works at the World Bank on a reputed post but Rudaba thinks that he is going to be some arrogant and rude brat, who doesn’t possess any love for his home country and values family. Her father tries his level best to make her understand that Buland is a good person and that he is not an inch of what she thinks of him. Buland is Bakhtiar’s son, and Bakhtiar loves Rudaba like his own daughter. Rudaba is one simple, innocent, down to earth and family oriented girl whose life revolves around her father and brother Adil (Yasir Mazher). Adil lives with his wife Sahira (Maheen Rizvi) who is big-headed, swollen with pride, rude and an outspoken women, living a luxurious life with her husband on her brother’s expenses. Adil works for Bashar Momin (Sahira’s brother). He makes his black money white illegally, which is why he lives in a separate house as Adil and Rudaba’s father has been a sincere and an honest bureaucrat throughout his life, so he wouldn’t allow his son to do such illegal stuff. No father would want such a life for his son. Furthermore, after Rudaba’s engagement, Sahira felt insulted as Rudaba’s father gave an insulting answer to Adil’s questions regarding Rudaba’s engagement. So Sahira tries her best and somehow succeeds in manipulating Rudaba’s mind and filling her brain with crap against Buland and his character. Rudaba, being innocent, actually believes what so ever Sahira says to her and complains to her father saying that no one can be that merciless, not even with his own daughter, but then he makes her understand that Sahira has this ability to control other’s mind, and that don’t let her do this to you. Bashar Momin’s appearance was unkind, arrogant, rude, and cruel. He has everything, be it money – power – status – fame and name but, he didn’t have happiness (this was obvious). Tayabba (Sundas Tariq), Sahira and Bashar’s younger sister, had been engaged twice, with those engagements being called off because of Bashar’s reputation. His pride once again leads to the engagement being broken off. He may be stiff, rude and arrogant from the outside but there is a soft heart that possess kindness, which is present there for her sister. Conclusively, Rudaba’s father and father-in-law get murdered by probably a mobile snatcher.

See also
 Bashar Momin
 List of Pakistani actresses
 List of Pakistani actors
 List of Pakistani television serials

References

Bashar Momin
Geo TV original programming
Pakistani drama television series
2014 Pakistani television series debuts
Urdu-language television shows
A&B Entertainment